is a passenger railway station located in the city of Akashi, Hyōgo Prefecture, Japan, operated by the West Japan Railway Company (JR West).

Lines

Station layout
The station consists of two ground-level side platforms connected by an elevated station building. The station has a Midori no Madoguchi staffed ticket office

Platforms

Adjacent stations

|-
!colspan=5|JR West

History
Uozumi Station opened on 1 October 1961. With the privatization of the Japan National Railways (JNR) on 1 April 1987, the station came under the aegis of the West Japan Railway Company.

Station numbering was introduced in March 2018 with Uozumi being assigned station number JR-A76.

Passenger statistics
In fiscal 2019, the station was used by an average of 11,540 passengers daily

Surrounding area
 Sanyo Uozumi Station
 Akashi National College of Technology
 Hyogo Prefectural Akashi Shimizu High School
 Akashi Municipal Akashi Commercial High School

See also
List of railway stations in Japan

References

External links

 JR West Station Official Site

Railway stations in Hyōgo Prefecture
Sanyō Main Line
Railway stations in Japan opened in 1961
Akashi, Hyōgo